Paraskevi ("Voula") Patoulidou (born 29 March 1965) is a Greek former athlete and politician. Born in Tripotamo (part of Florina prefecture), Patoulidou throughout her athletics career competed in the 100 metres, 100 metres hurdles and in the long jump events. In 1992, she was the surprise winner of the Women's 100 m hurdles race at the Olympic Games in Barcelona, and she was voted the Best Balkan Athlete that same year.

She was the candidate for the Prefecture of Thessaloniki in the local elections of Autumn 2006 supported by the opposition party of PASOK, but lost the election to Panagiotis Psomiadis. Her spouse is Dimitrios Zarzavatsidis. Since 1 September 2014, she is the Deputy Regional Governor of Thessaloniki in the Region of Central Macedonia.

Personal bests

Barcelona 1992
On 5 August 1992, Patoulidou  qualified for the final in the 100 m hurdles by improving her personal best from 12.96 (set in the qualifying round) to 12.88 seconds in the semi-finals. This success made her the first Greek woman ever to reach a track final in the Olympic Games.

One day later, the clear favourite of the 100 m hurdles final, Gail Devers of the United States, made a mistake and tripped on the last hurdle. Patoulidou took advantage and lunged her body forward for the finishing line. She crossed the line in 12.64 seconds, a Greek national record that still stands.

After 1992
After her Olympic gold medal Patoulidou decided to switch back to the long jump, her first love, believing that she had achieved as much as possible in the 100 m hurdles. She is vindicated for her choice when she participated in her second Olympic Games Final, in the 1996 Olympic Games in Atlanta, finishing 10th.

In the 2000 Sydney Olympic Games, Patoulidou was a member of the 4 × 100 m relay team that reached the semi-finals and ended up in the 13th place. She was given an honorary place in the 4 × 100 m relay team in the Athens Olympic Games in 2004, participating for the fifth time in the Olympic Games at the age of 39.

She was the only woman amongst the five Greek sporting legends chosen to be the penultimate runners in the 2004 Olympic torch relay, along with Nick Galis, Mimis Domazos, Kakhi Kakhiashvili and Ioannis Melissanidis (see 2004 Summer Olympics Opening Ceremony). She was also one of the penultimate runners of the 1996 torch relay in Atlanta, joining Evander Holyfield and Janet Evans.

International competitions

References 

 

1965 births
Living people
Greek female long jumpers
Greek female hurdlers
Olympic athletes of Greece
Olympic gold medalists for Greece
Athletes (track and field) at the 1988 Summer Olympics
Athletes (track and field) at the 1992 Summer Olympics
Athletes (track and field) at the 1996 Summer Olympics
Athletes (track and field) at the 2000 Summer Olympics
PASOK politicians
Greek sportsperson-politicians
PAOK athletes
Iraklis athletes
21st-century Greek women politicians
Medalists at the 1992 Summer Olympics
Olympic gold medalists in athletics (track and field)
Mediterranean Games gold medalists for Greece
Mediterranean Games silver medalists for Greece
Athletes (track and field) at the 1987 Mediterranean Games
Athletes (track and field) at the 1991 Mediterranean Games
Mediterranean Games medalists in athletics
People from Meliti (municipal unit)
Greek female sprinters